Terauchi Dam is a dam in the Fukuoka Prefecture of Japan.

References

Dams in Fukuoka Prefecture
Dams completed in 1978
1978 establishments in Japan